Demetrios J. Constantelos (July 27, 1927 – January 10, 2017) was a Greek researcher in Byzantology and a professor emeritus of history and religious studies at Stockton University, Pomona, NJ. He was born in Spilia, Messenia, Greece. He was ordained a priest of the Greek Orthodox Archdiocese of America in 1955 and earned a PhD in Byzantine Civilization at Rutgers University in 1965.

He died on 10 January 2017, at the age of 89.

Publications 
Publications by Demetrios Constantelos include:

 Christian Faith And Cultural Heritage : Essays from a Greek Orthodox Perspective
 Renewing the Church : The Significance of the Council in Trullo
 Paideia : Addresses to Young People
 The Complete Works of His Eminence Archbishop Iakovos, Primate of North and South America 1959-1996
 The Torchbearer : Encyclicals Spiritual and Ecclesiastical Subjects, Administration, Education, Culture
 Understanding the Greek Orthodox Church : Its Faith, History and Life
 Christian Hellenism, Volume Three : Essays and Studies in Continuity and Change
 The Greeks, Their Heritage, and Its Value Today
 Poverty, Society and Philanthropy in the Late Mediaeval Greek World
 Byzantine Philanthropy and Social Welfare
 Religious-Philosophical Issues and Interreligious Dialogues in the Orthodox Church Since World War II
 Orthodox Theology and Diakonia : Trends and Prospects Essays in Honor of His Eminence Archbishop Iakovos on the Occasion of His Seventieth Birthday
 Christian Hellenism: Essays and Studies in Continuity and Change (Hellenism: Ancient, Mediaeval Modern, 13) by Demetrios J. Constantelos

References 

1927 births
2017 deaths
Hellenic College Holy Cross Greek Orthodox School of Theology alumni
National and Kapodistrian University of Athens alumni
American historians of religion
Historians of antiquity
Eastern Orthodox theologians
Stockton University faculty
People from Kyparissia